Marshall is a census-designated place (CDP) and unincorporated town in northwestern Fauquier County, Virginia, in the United States. The population as of the 2010 census was 1,480.

History
Marshall was originally known as "Salem". It became Marshall after a short-lived incorporation. It is named after John Marshall, the former United States Supreme Court Chief Justice who grew up at Oak Hill in nearby Delaplane.

Marshall is home to the Fauquier Heritage and Preservation Foundation, as well as the Number 18 School in Marshall, which was the last one-room school in Fauquier County. Originally a whites-only schoolhouse, it was a blacks-only schoolhouse until it closed in the 1960s as a result of desegregation. It has been restored, and school groups often visit.

The Ashville Historic District, Marshall Historic District, Morgantown Historic District, Number 18 School in Marshall, and Waveland are listed on the National Register of Historic Places.

Geography
Marshall is centered along State Route 55 between two exits on Interstate 66. U.S. Route 17 runs south from Marshall  to Warrenton, the Fauquier County seat.

The community sits on a low watershed divide: the north and west sides of town drain north toward Goose Creek, a tributary of the Potomac River, while the south side drains south via Carter Run to the Rappahannock River.

Although Marshall has historically been an agricultural community, its designation as one of nine service districts within Fauquier County, and the only one in northern Fauquier County, has resulted in a unique set of business and professional service offerings to the mostly equestrian and agricultural interests in the surrounding region.

See also
Fresta Valley Christian School

References

External links

John Marshall Library
Fauquier Heritage and Preservation Foundation

Census-designated places in Fauquier County, Virginia
Former municipalities in Virginia
Census-designated places in Virginia